Pygoctenucha pyrrhoura is a moth in the family Erebidae. It was described by George Duryea Hulst in 1881. It is found in the US states of Texas and Colorado.

The wingspan is about 32 mm.

References

Moths described in 1881
Phaegopterina